The 2022 California State Senate election were held on Tuesday, November 8, 2022, with the primary election occurring on June 7, 2022. Voters in the 20 even-numbered districts of the California State Senate elected their representatives. The elections coincided with elections for other offices, including the state assembly.

Predictions

Overview

Summary by State Senate District 
Bold = incumbent
Italic = former senator

Primary elections

General elections

Retiring incumbents 
4th: Jim Nielsen (R–Red Bluff): Termed out of office
6th: Richard Pan (D–Sacramento): Termed out of office
8th: Andreas Borgeas (R-Fresno): Retiring
10th: Bob Wieckowski (D–Fremont): Termed out of office
18th: Robert Hertzberg (D–Van Nuys): Termed out of office
20th: Connie Leyva (D-Chino): Running for San Bernardino County Supervisor
28th: Melissa Melendez (R–Lake Elsinore): Termed out of office
30th: Sydney Kamlager (D-Los Angeles): Running for California's 37th congressional district
36th: Patricia Bates (R–Laguna Niguel): Termed out of office
40th: Ben Hueso (D–San Diego): Termed out of office

District 2 

The 2nd district encompasses most of the North Coast region, stretching from the Oregon border to the northern Bay Area to include Del Norte, Humboldt, Trinity, Mendocino, Sonoma, and  Marin Counties. The incumbent is two-term Democrat Mike McGuire of Healdsburg, who is running for a third term.

Candidates

Declared
Mike McGuire (Democratic), incumbent state senator
Gene Yoon (Republican), lawyer

Endorsements

Results

District 4 

The new 4th district is located in the northeastern Central Valley, the central Sierra Nevada, and Death Valley, including Stanislaus, Calaveras, Amador, El Dorado, Placer, Alpine, Tuolumne, Mariposa, Madera, Mono, and Inyo counties. The district has no incumbent.

Candidates

Declared
Marie Alvarado-Gil (Democratic), charter school administrator and former vice president of the Amador County Democratic Central Committee
Steven Bailey (Republican), former El Dorado County Superior Court judge and runner-up for Attorney General of California in 2018
Jolene Daly (Republican), marriage and family therapist
Michael Gordon (Republican), president of the Rescue Union School District board of trustees
Jack Griffith (Republican), retired combat engineer
Jeff McKay (Republican), Stanislaus Union School Board trustee and former Ceres city councilor
Tim Robertson (Democratic), director of North Valley Labor Federation

Endorsements

Results

District 6 

The 6th district is located in northern and eastern suburbs of the Sacramento metropolitan area, including the Sacramento County cities of Rancho Cordova,  Carmichael, Fair Oaks, Gold River, Arden-Arcade, Folsom, Orangevale, Citrus Heights, and Antelope, and the western Placer County exurbs of Granite Bay, Roseville, Rocklin, Loomis, Whitney, and Lincoln. The incumbent in this area is Republican Jim Nielsen of the former 4th district, who is term-limited and cannot run for re-election.

Candidates

Declared
Michael Huang (Republican), family medicine physician
Roger Niello (Republican), former state assemblyman from the 5th district
Paula Villescaz (Democratic), director of legislative advocacy for the County Welfare Directors Association and member and former president of the San Juan Unified School District board

Endorsements

Results

District 8 

The new 8th district is located in the core of the Sacramento metropolitan area, consisting of the state capital of Sacramento and surrounding suburbs, including Rio Linda, McClellan Park, North Highlands, Vineyard, Rosemont, Florin, and Elk Grove. The incumbent in this area is Democrat Richard Pan of Sacramento of the former 6th district, who is term-limited and cannot run for re-election.

Candidates

Declared
Angelique Ashby (Democratic), vice mayor of Sacramento
Rafa Garcia (Democratic), union representative and attorney
Dave Jones (Democratic), former California Insurance Commissioner, former state assemblyman from the 9th district, and former Sacramento city councilor

Withdrawn
Matt Burgess (Democratic), California Highway Patrol sergeant
Eric Guerra (Democratic), Sacramento city councilor (running for State Assembly)
Tecoy Porter (Democratic), community activist (running for State Assembly)

Endorsements

Results

District 10 

The 10th district is located in the East Bay in Alameda County and the northwestern corner of Silicon Valley in Santa Clara County, including Fremont, Hayward, Union City, Newark, Milpitas, Sunnyvale, and Santa Clara. The incumbent is Democrat Bob Wieckowski of Fremont, who is term-limited and cannot run for re-election.

Candidates

Declared
Jim Canova (Democratic), member of the Santa Clara Unified School Board
Jamal Khan (Democratic), attorney and candidate for San Jose City Council in 2020
Raymond Liu (Democratic), engineer
Lily Mei (Democratic), Mayor of Fremont
Paul Pimentel (Republican), telecommunications company owner

Withdrawn
Jaime Raul Zepeda (Democratic), community organizer (endorsed Wahab)

Endorsements

Results

District 12 

The new 12th district encompasses the southeastern Central Valley and the northwestern corner of the Mojave Desert, including most of Kern County and the eastern portions of Tulare County and Fresno County. It merged the districts of first-term Republican Shannon Grove of Bakersfield of the former 16th district, who is running for re-election here and first-term Republican Andreas Borgeas of the former 8th district, who decided not to seek reelection.

Candidates

Declared
Shannon Grove (Republican), incumbent state senator from the 16th district
Susanne Gundy (Democratic), retired program manager

Endorsements

Results

District 14 

The new 14th district is located in the western Central Valley, including Merced County and western Fresno County. The incumbents in this area are first-term Democrat Anna Caballero of Merced and the former 12th district and first-term Democrat Melissa Hurtado of Sanger and the former 14th district. Both incumbents initially were running for re-election in this district, but Hurtado dropped out to run for the 16th district.

Candidates

Declared
Anna Caballero (Democratic), incumbent state senator from the 12th district
Paulina Miranda (Democratic), perennial candidate
Amnon Shor (Republican), rabbi

Withdrawn
Melissa Hurtado (Democratic), incumbent state senator from the 14th district (running in the 16th district)

Endorsements

Results

District 16 

The new 16th district encompasses the southwestern Central Valley, including Kings County, western Tulare County, and northwestern Kern County. The seat has no incumbent. On December 14, candidate David Shepard filed for a recount, after the race was certified with Senator Hurtado in the lead by a 20-vote margin. The recount concluded on January 17, with Shepard gaining 11 votes, while Hurtado gained 4.

Candidates

Declared
Melissa Hurtado (Democratic), incumbent state senator from the 14th district
Bryan Osorio (Democratic), Mayor of Delano
Nicole Parra (Democratic), former state assemblywoman from the 30th district
David Shepard (Republican), grape farmer
Gregory Tatum (Republican), pastor

Withdrawn
Imelda Ceja (Democratic), nurse
Rob Fuentes (Democratic), attorney

Endorsements

Results

District 18

The new 18th district stretches along the Mexico–United States border and includes rural Imperial Valley and areas of California along the Colorado River, including Needles, Blythe and Indio, but most of the population is in southern San Diego County, including Imperial Beach, Otay Mesa, Chula Vista, National City, Lincoln Acres, Bonita, the Tijuana River Valley, and the southeast side of San Diego. The incumbent in this area is two-term Democrat Ben Hueso of San Diego and the former 40th district, who is term-limited and cannot seek re-election.

Candidates

Declared
 Alejandro Galicia (Republican), small business owner
 Steve Padilla (Democratic), Chula Vista city councilor and former Mayor of Chula Vista

Endorsements

Results

District 20 

The new 20th district contains most of the San Fernando Valley section of northern Los Angeles, including Burbank, Van Nuys, Reseda, Canoga Park, Tujunga, Sun Valley, Shadow Hills, Lake View Terrace, Arleta, Panorama City, Pacoima, Mission Hills, San Fernando, and Sylmar. The incumbent in this area is two-term Democrat Robert Hertzberg of Van Nuys and the former 18th district, who is term-limited and cannot seek re-election.

Candidates

Declared
Ely De La Cruz Ayao (Republican), real estate broker
Daniel Hertzberg (Democratic), business travel sales manager and son of incumbent state senator Robert Hertzberg
Caroline Menjivar (Democratic), social worker and U.S. Marine Corps veteran
Seydi Alejandra Morales (Democratic), attorney

Endorsements

Results

District 22 

The new 22nd district consists of the eastern San Gabriel Valley and the Pomona Valley in Los Angeles County, including El Monte, West Covina, Covina, Duarte, Baldwin Park, Irwindale, Vincent, Azusa, San Dimas, La Verne, and Pomona, as well as Montclair, Chino, and Ontario in the southwestern corner of San Bernardino County. The incumbents in this area are first-term Democrat Susan Rubio of Baldwin Park or the former 22nd district and second-term Democrat Connie Leyva of Chino or the former 20th district. Rubio ran for re-election, while Leyva ran for San Bernardino County Supervisor.

Candidates

Declared 
Kimo Mateo (Republican), operations manager
Susan Rubio (Democratic), incumbent state senator
Vincent Tsai (Republican), Los Angeles County Deputy sheriff

Declined 
 Connie Leyva, incumbent state senator from the 20th district

Endorsements

Results

District 24 

The new 24th district contains the Westside Los Angeles neighborhoods of Venice, West Los Angeles, Pacific Palisades, Brentwood, Bel Air, Century City, Sunset Strip, Laurel Canyon, Hollywood, and Miracle Mile, and the Santa Monica Mountains cities such as Hidden Hills, Calabasas, Topanga, and Malibu, as well as most of the South Bay cities of Los Angeles County, including Rancho Palos Verdes, Rolling Hills, Torrance, Redondo Beach, Manhattan Beach, El Segundo, Marina Del Rey, Santa Monica, Beverly Hills, and West Hollywood, and The incumbent in this area is two-term Democrat Ben Allen of Santa Monica and the former 26th district, who is running for re-election.

Candidates

Delcared
Ben Allen (Democratic), incumbent state senator
Kristina Irwin (Republican), realtor (write-in)

Endorsements

Results

District 26 

The new  26th district is located in the central and eastern Los Angeles neighborhoods of Los Feliz, East Hollywood, Silver Lake, Echo Park, Cypress Park, Koreatown, Wilshire Center, Westlake, Glassell Park, Eagle Rock,  Garvanza, Lincoln Heights, Hermon, Little Tokyo, Chinatown, Boyle Heights, and El Sereno, along with the adjascent communities of City Terrace, East Los Angeles and Vernon. The incumbent in this area is first-term Democrat Maria Elena Durazo of Los Angeles and the former 24th district, who is seeking re-election.

Candidates

Declared
Maria Elena Durazo (Democratic), incumbent state senator

Endorsements

Results

District 28 

The new 28th district contains Downtown Los Angeles and most of South Central Los Angeles, including Park La Brea, Pico Union, Mid City, West Adams, Baldwin Hills, Hyde Park, Nevin, Leimert Park, Jefferson Park, Crenshaw, Vermont Square, Adams-Normandie, Florence, Exposition Park, and University Park, as well as suburbs of Culver City, Ladera Heights, and a small part of the Westside Los Angeles neighborhoods, including Palms, Mar Vista and Playa Vista. The incumbent in this area is first-term Democrat Sydney Kamlager of Los Angeles and the former 30th district, who is leaving to run for a seat in the United States House of Representatives.

Candidates

Declared
Jamaal Gulledge (Democratic), human resources manager
Joe Lusizzo (Republican), restaurant owner
Kamilah Victoria Moore (Democratic), attorney and activist
Lola Smallwood-Cuevas (Democratic), labor advocate
Cheryl Turner (Democratic), civil rights lawyer

Endorsements

Results

District 30 

The new 30th district contains the Gateway Cities region of southeastern Los Angeles County, including Downey, Norwalk, Bellflower, La Mirada, Santa Fe Springs, Los Nietos, Montebello, Pico Rivera, Whittier, Hacienda Heights, La Puente, Valinda, Avocado Heights,  Industry, Rowland Heights, Walnut, and Diamond Bar, along with Brea in northeastern Orange County. The incumbent in this area is first-term Democrat Bob Archuleta of the former 32nd district, who is seeking re-election.

Candidates

Declared
Bob Archuleta (Democratic), incumbent state senator from the 32nd district
Henry Bouchot (Democratic), Whittier city councilor
Martha Camacho Rodriguez (Democratic), teacher
Mitch Clemmons (Republican), plumbing business owner

Endorsements

Results

District 32 

The new 32nd district consists of the southwestern corner of the Inland Empire, including the Riverside County communities of Temecula, Murrieta, Wildomar, Lake Elsinore, Canyon Lake, Lakeland Village, Alberhill, Menifee, Sage, and Idyllwild, along with Yorba Linda in eastern Orange County, Chino Hills in southwestern San Bernardino County and the rural, northeastern corner of San Diego County. The incumbent in this area, Republican Melissa Melendez of the former 28th district, is term-limited and cannot seek re-election.

Candidates

Declared
Brian Nash (Democratic), analytics consultant
Kelly Seyarto (Republican), state assemblyman from the 67th district

Endorsements

Results

District 34 

The 34th district is based in northern Orange County, including most of Santa Ana, Anaheim,  Placentia, Fullerton, Buena Park, La Habra, and the west side of Orange, along with the unincorporated community of South Whittier in Los Angeles County. The incumbent is first-term Democrat Tom Umberg of Santa Ana, who is seeking re-election.

Candidates

Declared
Rhonda Shader (Republican), Mayor of Placentia
Tom Umberg (Democratic), incumbent state senator

Endorsements

Results

District 36 

The new 36th district encompasses most of coastal Orange County, including Seal Beach, Huntington Beach, Newport Beach, Emerald Bay, Laguna Beach, and Dana Point, and the Little Saigon area of northwestern Orange County, including Garden Grove, Westminster, Fountain Valley, Midway City, Stanton, Cypress, Rossmoor, and Los Alimitos, along with Artesia, Cerritos, and Hawaiian Gardens in southwestern Los Angeles County. The seat has no incumbent.

Candidates

Declared 
 Kim Carr (Democratic), Huntington Beach city councilor and former Mayor of Huntington Beach
 Janet Nguyen (Republican), state assemblywoman from the 72nd district and former state senator from the 34th district

Endorsements

Results

District 38 

The new 38th district encompasses the coastal North County  San Diego County communities of La Jolla, Del Mar, Solana Beach, Cardiff, Rancho Santa Fe, Encinitas, Carlsbad, Vista, Oceanside, San Luis Rey, and Camp Pendleton Marine Corps Base, along with the southern edge of Orange County, including San Clemente, San Juan Capistrano,  Ladera Ranch, Las Flores, and Rancho Santa Margarita. The incumbent in this area, Republican Patricia Bates (R–Laguna Niguel), is term-limited and cannot seek re-election.

Candidates

Declared 
Catherine Blakespear (Democratic), Mayor of Encinitas and chair of the San Diego Association of Governments
Matt Gunderson (Republican), automobile dealer
Joe Kerr (Democratic), retired Orange County fire captain

Withdrawn 
Priya Bhat-Patel (Democratic), Carlsbad city councilor

Declined
Lisa Bartlett (Republican), Orange County supervisor (running for U.S. House)
Bill Brough (Republican), former state assemblyman from the 73rd district

Endorsements

Results

District 40

The new 40th district encompasses much of inland San Diego County, including Santee, Poway, Alpine, Pine Valley, Ramona, San Marcos, Escondido, Hidden Meadows, Valley Center, Pauma Valley, and Fallbrook, as well as the northeastern parts of the city of San Diego. The incumbent in this area is Republican Brian Jones of Santee and the former 38th district, who is seeking re-election.

Candidates

Declared
Brian Jones (Republican), incumbent state senator
Joseph Rocha (Democratic), attorney and U.S. Marine Corps veteran

Endorsements

Results

See also 
2022 United States elections
2022 United States Senate election in California
2022 United States House of Representatives elections in California
2022 California elections
2022 California gubernatorial election
2022 California State Assembly election

Notes

References

External links
Official campaign websites for 4th district candidates
Marie Alvarado-Gil (D) for State Senate
Official campaign websites for 8th district candidates
Angelique Ashby (D) for State Senate
Rafa Garcia (D) for State Senate
Dave Jones (D) for State Senate
Official campaign websites for 10th district candidates
Jim Canova (D) for State Senate
Jamal Khan (D) for State Senate
Lily Mei (D) for State Senate
Aisha Wahab (D) for State Senate
Official campaign websites for 18th district candidates
Steve Padilla (D) for State Senate
Official campaign websites for 20th district candidates
Daniel Hertzberg (D) for State Senate
Caroline Menjivar (D) for State Senate
Official campaign websites for 30th district candidates
Bob Archuleta (D) for State Senate
Henry Bouchot (D) for State Senate
Official campaign websites for 34th district candidates
Tom Umberg (D) for State Senate
Official campaign websites for 38th district candidates
Catherine Blakespear (D) for State Senate

State Senate
California Senate
California State Senate elections
Politics of California